CHD may refer to:

Medicine
 Congenital heart defect
 Coronary heart disease

Organizations
 Church and Dwight, US household product manufacturer, NYSE symbol

Transportation
 Russian Air Force, ICAO code
 Chesterfield railway station, England, National Rail code
 Chandler Municipal Airport, Arizona, USA, FAA LID

Technology
 Compressed Hunks of Data, a file format used by the MAME emulator

Other
 Chad, UNDP country code
 Chicago Hittite Dictionary, Oriental Institute of the University of Chicago